Thomas Smith (c. 1686–1728), of South Tidworth, Hampshire, was a British landowner and Whig politician who sat in the House of Commons between 1709 and 1728.

Smith was the eldest son of John Smith, a leading Whig politician, and his second wife Anne Strickland, daughter of Sir Thomas Strickland of Boynton, Yorkshire. He was appointed to office as Clerk of the Council in extraordinary in March 1706, probably due to his father's influence. In July 1706 he was sent to the Elector of Hanover, with the son of the Earl of Scarbrough, to give their respective fathers' compliments.

Smith was returned as Member of Parliament for Milborne Port at a by-election 7 May 1709, probably with the support of the other Member for the borough, Sir Thomas Travell, to whom he may have been related through Travell's mother. He voted for the impeachment of Dr Sacheverell in 1710 but his other parliamentary activities are almost impossible to distinguish. At the 1710 election, he transferred to East Looe. He was removed from office, along with his father, in 1712. He voted on 18 June 1713 against the French commerce bill. He did not stand at the 1713 election but returned to Parliament after the accession of George I, when he was classed as a Whig.

Smith was returned Whig MP for Eye at the 1715 election on the Cornwallis interest. He voted against the septennial bill and the repeal of the Occasional Conformity and Schism Acts, but for the Peerage Bill. He did not stand at the 1722 election. In 1723 he succeeded his father to the Tedworth House estate at South Tidworth. He was brought in for Tregony on the Treasury interest at the 1727 election after George II's accession, when he obtained a court office as vice-chamberlain to Queen Caroline 1727.

Smith died unmarried on 3 August 1728. The Tedworth estate was inherited by Thomas Assheton of Ashley Hall, Cheshire.

References

1680s births
1728 deaths
Members of the Parliament of Great Britain for English constituencies
British MPs 1708–1710
British MPs 1710–1713
British MPs 1715–1722
British MPs 1727–1734